Pat Cahill (25 July 1919 – 24 November 1966) was a former Australian rules footballer who played with Footscray and St Kilda in the Victorian Football League (VFL). Prior to playing with Footscray, the 18yo Cahill spent the 1938 season with Williamstown in the VFA, where he played 11 games and kicked 6 goals and was awarded the best first-year player trophy. After playing in round one of the 1939 season, Cahill crossed to Footscray without a clearance. He was the younger brother of Ted Cahill, who had also played for Footscray in 1927-28 and Williamstown 1929-34.

Notes

External links 
		

1919 births
1966 deaths
Australian rules footballers from Victoria (Australia)
Western Bulldogs players
St Kilda Football Club players
Williamstown Football Club players
Place of birth missing
Place of death missing